Villanueva may refer to:

Places

Colombia
Villanueva, Bolívar, a town and municipality in Bolívar Department
Villanueva, Casanare, a town and municipality in Casanare Department
Villanueva, La Guajira, a town and municipality in La Guajira Department
Villanueva, Santander, a town and municipality in Santander Department

Honduras 
Villanueva, Cortés, a municipality in  Cortés department, Honduras

Mexico 
Villanueva, Zacatecas, a town in Zacatecas, Mexico

Nicaragua 
Villanueva, Chinandega, municipality in the Chinandega Department

Philippines
Villanueva, Misamis Oriental, a municipality in Misamis Oriental province

Spain
 Villanueva (Navia), a parish in Asturias
 Villanueva (Ribadedeva), a parish in Asturias
 Villanueva (Santo Adriano), a parish in Asturias
 Villanueva (Teverga), a parish in Asturias
 Villanueva (parish), a parish in Villanueva de Oscos, Asturias

United States 
Villanueva, New Mexico, a village in New Mexico

Other uses
Villanueva University
Villanueva (surname)
CD Villanueva, a football team in Villanueva de Córdoba, Andalusia, Spain
Villanueva CF, a Spanish football team in Villanueva de Gállego, Aragon, Spain
Villanueva F.C., a football team in Villanueva, Cortés, Honduras
Villanueva State Park, a New Mexico State Park
Villanueva River, a tributary of the Cesar River in Colombia

See also

Villa Nueva (disambiguation)
Villeneuve (disambiguation)
Villanova (disambiguation)
Vilanova (disambiguation)